Planchonia valida grows as a tree up to  tall, with a trunk diameter of up to . The bark is grey brown. The flowers are green. The tree grows in a variety of habitats from sea level to  altitude. P. valida is found in the Andaman and Nicobar Islands, Malaysia and Indonesia.

References

valida
Flora of the Andaman Islands
Flora of the Nicobar Islands
Trees of Malesia
Plants described in 1826